Seven ships of the French Navy have born the name Illustre ("Illustrious")

Ships named Illustre 
 , a 64-gun ship of the line. 
 , a galley. 
 , a 64-gun ship of the line, lead ship of her class . 
 , a 74-gun Magnanime-class ship of the line. 
 , a 74-gun Téméraire-class ship of the line of the Borée sub-type, was originally ordered as Illustre. 
 , a 80-gun Bucentaure-class ship of the line. 
 , a 80-gun Bucentaure-class ship of the line, was renamed Illustre at the Bourbon Restauration.

See also

Notes and references

Notes

References

Bibliography 
 

French Navy ship names